Robert Ito (born July 2, 1931) is a Canadian actor of Japanese ancestry. He is known for his television and film work, including the roles of Sam Fujiyama on the 1976–83 NBC series Quincy, M.E. and Larry Mishima on the 1980s CBS primetime soap opera Falcon Crest, and a variety of voice acting for animation. He was nominated for a Gemini Award for his performance in the 1994 film Trial at Fortitude Bay.

Career
Ito was a dancer with the National Ballet of Canada before coming to Broadway and dancing in such shows as "Flower Drum Song"(1960-1961).. He turned to acting in the mid-1960s, which led to a number of roles playing Asian or Asian-ancestry characters in American productions. He appeared three times (as different characters) in the 1970s TV series Kung Fu; first as a Chinese rail worker in the two-hour movie that launched the series, later as a Chinese bandit named Captain Lee in the episode "The Way of Violence Has No Mind" and another time as a Japanese Ninja in the episode entitled "The Assassin". 

He likewise portrayed two different Korean characters in episodes of the TV series M*A*S*H, in 1972 and 1976. Ito acted in the 1976 film Midway as Minoru Genda, the leader of the 1942 attack on Midway Island. In 1976, he was cast as forensic lab technician Sam Fujiyama, a regular supporting role he played for seven years on Quincy, M.E.

His other film credits include The Terminal Man (1974), Rollerball (1975), Peeper (1976), Special Delivery (1976), Black Sunday (1977), SST: Death Flight (1977), The Adventures of Buckaroo Banzai Across the 8th Dimension (1984), Pray for Death (1985), Aloha Summer (1988) and The Vineyard (1989). Ito guest-starred on the Star Trek: The Next Generation episode "Coming of Age" as TAC officer Lt. Chang and on Star Trek: Voyager as John Kim (Harry Kim's father). 

Voice roles include such programs and films as The King of Queens, Avatar: The Last Airbender, Captain Planet and the Planeteers, Animaniacs, Bonkers, Batman: The Animated Series, Jackie Chan Adventures, Fantastic Max, Superman: The Animated Series, SWAT Kats: The Radical Squadron, My Little Pony and Friends, Where on Earth Is Carmen Sandiego?, Biker Mice from Mars, Quack Pack, Capitol Critters, ProStars, Justice League, Darkwing Duck, Chip 'n Dale Rescue Rangers, Iron Man, The Karate Kid, A Pup Named Scooby-Doo, Bill & Ted's Excellent Adventures, Rambo and the Forces of Freedom, The Amazing Chan and the Chan Clan, Savage Dragon, TaleSpin, Chuck Norris: Karate Kommandos, The Sylvester and Tweety Mysteries, All Grown Up!, The Mummy: The Animated Series, Teen Titans: Trouble in Tokyo, The Woody Woodpecker Show (the 1999 version), The Wild Thornberrys, Jonny Quest vs. The Cyber Insects, and Gargoyles.

Selected filmography

Television

Get Smart (1965) (as Number 3 in The Amazing Harry Hoo – uncredited)
Women of the Prehistoric Planet (1966) as Tang
Dimension 5 (1966) as Sato
It Takes a Thief (1968 American T.V. series, season 1, episode 9) as Chief Aide
Some Kind of a Nut (1969) as George Toyota
Mannix (1970) season 4, episode 5, as Dr. Yoshira
Kung Fu (1972) Movie Pilot as Fong
 Mannix (1973) season 6, episode 20, as Dr. Sato
Kung Fu (1973) season 2, episode 17, "The Assassin" as Blacksmith/Ninja
Soylent Green (1973) as Shoe Seller (uncredited)
The Naked Ape (1973) as Samurai Warrior
Kung Fu (1974) season 2, episode 30, as Captain Lee
The Terminal Man (1974) as Anesthetist
Airport 1975 (1974) as Passenger (uncredited)
Rollerball (1975) as Strategy Coach for Houston Team
Peeper (1976) as Butler
Midway (1976) as Cmdr. Minoru Genda
Special Delivery (1976) as Mr. Chu
SST: Death Flight (1977) as Flight Engineer Roy Nakamura
Black Sunday (1977) as Japanese Man (uncredited)
Gray Lady Down (1978) as Seaman at base (uncredited)
The Adventures of Buckaroo Banzai Across the 8th Dimension (1984) as Professor Hikita
Pray for Death (1985) as Koga
P.I. Private Investigations (1987) as Kim
Aloha Summer (1988) as Ted Tanaka
The Vineyard (1989) as Auctioneer
Crazy People (1990) as Yamashita's Aide
The War Between Us (1995) as Mr. Kawashima
Hollow Point (1996) as Shin Chan
The Omega Code (1999) as Shimoro Lin Che
Lima: Breaking the Silence (1999) as President Fujimoro

References

External links

1931 births
Canadian expatriates in the United States
Canadian male actors of Japanese descent
Japanese-Canadian internees
Canadian male film actors
Canadian male television actors
Canadian male voice actors
Living people
Male actors from Vancouver
20th-century Canadian male actors
21st-century Canadian male actors